The 2012 ESF men's Super Cup club championships was an international softball competition for men's fastpitch being held at Eagles Park and Svoboda Park in Prague, Czech Republic from August 27 to September 1, 2012. The Super Cup was a new edition of the ESF Men's European Cup, merging the old European Cup with the ESF Cup Winners Cup.  The teams first competed in pool play, with the top 8 teams qualifying for the Super Cup, and the bottom 8 teams playing for the ESF Challenge Cup.  After pool play, the setup for both the Super Cup and the Challenge Cup was a double elimination knockout system.
In the end, the Hørsholm Hurricanes won the first Super Cup title.

First round

Pool A

Pool B

Pool C

Pool D

Super Cup Knock Out round

Challenge Cup Knock Out round

Super Cup playoffs

Medal round

Challenge Cup playoffs

Final round

Final standings

See also
Softball
European Softball Federation
ESF men's EC club championships

External links 
Cup 2012

References

Softball in Denmark
2012 in Czech sport
2012 in softball
Softball in Europe